VOF de Kunst, better known in Europe as The Art Company, is a Dutch pop group from Tilburg founded in 1983. Their hit song was "Suzanne" (or "Susanna") which reached No. 1 and No. 12 on the charts in the Netherlands and UK, respectively. The lead singer of the band is Nol Havens, and they have also toured using The Art Company name. This latter moniker was used for their only UK hit.

Discography 

The group has released 18 albums, including 1 live album.

The group has also produced albums of traditional festive songs and songs based on nursery rhymes and the works of Annie M. G. Schmidt. Since 1996, they have also played in theatre productions.

 1983: Maandagmorgen 6:30
 1984: Een Jaar Later
 1987: Onbeperkt Houdbaar
 1988: Open Huis in Artis
 1990: Dikkertje Dap & Andere Bekende TV-Liedjes Van Annie M.G. Schmidt
 1991: De Kunst Live
 1993: De Nette Man
 1994: De Griezel CD 
 1997: De Kerstboom Spreekt
 2000: Balen!
 2004: Teunis
 2005: Wilde Dierenliedjes
 2006: Het Grote Boek van Madelief
 2007: Vanaf Hier Nog 5 Kwartier
 2008: Druk
 2009: Muziek op Schoot
 2010: VOF De Kunst Zingt Jip En Janneke
 2013: 2(013)

References

External links
Official website 

Musical groups established in 1983
Dutch pop music groups
1983 establishments in the Netherlands
CBS Records artists